Warden of Red Rock is a 2001 American Western television film starring James Caan. It was directed by Stephen Gyllenhaal and written by James Lee Barrett.

Cast
 James Caan as John Flinders
 David Carradine as Mike Sullivan
 Rachel Ticotin as Maria McVale
 Brian Dennehy as Sheriff Selwyn Church
 Billy Rieck as Harry Joe Reese
 Gisela Sanchez as Dolores
 Lloyd Lowe as Ray Otis
 Kirk Baltz as Gil Macon
 Jim Beaver as Jefferson Bent
 Sergio Calderon as Toro
 Gregory Norman Cruz as Taza
 Michael Cavanaugh as Senator Paul Townsend
 Mark Metcalf as Carl McVale
 Michael Harney as Henry Masters
 Roger Cudney as Prisoner

References

External links
 
 Warden of Red Rock at TCMDB

2001 television films
2001 films
American Western (genre) television films
Showtime (TV network) films
2000s English-language films
2001 Western (genre) films